Ratneshwar Mahadev Mandir (also known as Matri-rin Mahadev, or Leaning temple of Varanasi) is one of the most photographed temples in the holy city of Varanasi in Uttar Pradesh, India. The temple, while apparently well-preserved, leans significantly towards the back side (north-west), and its garbhagriha is generally below the water much of the year, except for a few months during the summer.  The Ratneshwar Mahadev Temple is situated at Manikarnika Ghat, Varanasi. The temple has developed a nine-degree slant.

Architecture
The temple is elegantly constructed in the classical style with a Nagara Shikhara and Phamsana mandapa. The site of the temple is very unusual. Unlike all other temples in Varanasi on the banks of Ganga, the temple is built at a very low level. In fact, the water level can reach the shikhara part of the temple. The temple leans over 25 degrees.

It is constructed at a very low spot; the builder must have known that its garbhagriha would be underwater for much of the year. In spite of much of the temple being underwater during most of the year, it is well preserved, except for the lean that can be noted in 20th century photos.

The temple is 74 feet in height.

History
The Temple is also known as Kashi Karvat (Kashi is the ancient name for Varanasi and karvat means leaning in Hindi). The actual time of construction is unknown. However, the priests claim it was built by an unnamed servant of Raja Man Singh for his mother Ratna Bai about 500 years ago. According to the revenue records, it was constructed from 1825 to 1830. However, according to Dr. Ratnesh Varma of District Cultural Committee, it was constructed by the Amethi royal family. James Prinsep, who was an assay master at the Banaras Mint from 1820 to 1830, created a series of drawings, one of which includes the Ratneshwar Mahadev temple. He commented that when the temple entrance was underwater, the priest used to dive in the water to conduct worship.

Some sources claim that was built by Queen Baija Bai of Gwalior in the 19th century. According to another story, it was built by a female servant of Ahilya Bai of Indore, named Ratna Bai. Ahilya Bai cursed it to lean because her servant had named it after herself.

Photographs from 1860s do not show the building leaning. Modern photographs show a lean of about nine degrees. The building is likely leaning due to waterlogged foundation. A lightning strike in 2015 caused slight damage to some of the elements of the shikhara.

Location
The temple in Manikarnika Ghat is located in front to the Tarkeshwar Mahadev Mandir built in 1795 by Ahilyabai Holkar, where Lord Shiva is said to recite the Taraka Mantra (salvation mantra). Between the two temple is a spot that was termed as the  holiest spot in Banaras by James Prinsep in 1832. An 1865 photograph terms one of the temples as the Vishnupad temple. It is likely the Ganesh temple with the Charan Paduka of Lord Vishnu near it (only distinguished individuals can be cremated at the spot). The same spot is said to have been the site of a Sati in a 1903 print.

Gallery

See also

 Kashi Vishwanath Temple
 Shree Ratneshwar Mahadev Temple, Karachi
 Hindu temples in Varanasi

References

Shiva temples in Varanasi
Hindu temples in Varanasi